The 2009 Ulster Senior Football Championship was the 121st installment of the annual Ulster Senior Football Championship held under the auspices of the Ulster GAA. It was won by Tyrone who defeated Antrim in the final. Antrim were appearing in their first final since 1970. The winning Tyrone team received the Anglo-Celt Cup, and automatically advanced to the quarter-final stage of the 2009 All-Ireland Senior Football Championship.

Teams who lost at the preliminary round, quarter-final or semi-final stages entered Round 1 of the All-Ireland Qualifiers. The beaten Ulster finalists entered at Round 3. Successfully advancing through the Qualifiers allowed a team to reach the All-Ireland quarter-finals.

The draw for the 2009 Ulster Senior Football Championship was made along with the other three provincial draws on 8 October 2008 at Croke Park in Dublin.

Bracket

Source: Ulster GAA Council

Preliminary round

Quarter-finals

Semi-finals

Final

References

External links
Ulster GAA website

2U
Gaelic
Ulster Senior Football Championship